Muhammad Ibn Yahya al-Janzi was a Persian scholar, who was born in Nishapur. He was a student of Al-Ghazali and was responsible for spreading his teachings of Shafite Law in Nishapur.

Biography
Muhammad Ibn Yahya al-Janzi was an Imam, Mufti, and Shafite Scholar. Just like al-Ghazali, he also had expertise in debates and silencing one's opponents.

During his lifetime, he became an esteemed scholar & was appointed as a head teacher in Nizamiyya  The famous historian Ibn al-Sam'ani also studied under him. Imam Fakhar-ud-din al-Razi is linked with al-Ghazali through Abu Nasr Ahmad ibn Zirr ibn Aqil al-Kamal al-Simnani (d. 575), who was also the student of Yahya al-Janzi.

Works
Just like al-Nawawi wrote a commentary, of a commentary (written by his teacher Ibn al-Salah), of al-Ghazali's "al-Wasit Fil Madhab" titled "Rawdat al-Talibin" & al-Rafi wrote "al-Fath al-azeez fi sharh al-Wajiz", Yahya al-Janzi also wrote a commentary titled "al-Muhit fi Sharh al-Wasit".

He said about al-Ghazali:

Students
Amongst the famous students of Yahya al-Janzi were:
 Ibn al-Sam'ani
 Abu Mansur Muhammad Ibn Muhammad al-Tusi (d. 567)
 Abu Fath Muhammad Ibn Mahmud al-Tusi (d. 596) 
 Abu Nasr Ahmad ibn Zirr ibn Aqil al-Kamal al-Simnani
 Najm al-Din al-Khabushani

Death
Yahya al-Janzi died in 549H/1154 AD in Nishapur.

See also
List of Ash'aris and Maturidis

References

Shafi'is
Mujaddid
Hadith scholars
Sunni Muslim scholars of Islam
1083 births
1154 deaths
12th-century Muslim scholars of Islam
12th-century jurists
11th-century jurists
Biographical evaluation scholars